Duodecimal system may refer to:

duodecimal, a base-12 number system
Dewey Decimal Classification, a misspelling of the library code